J.E. Heartbreak II is the eighth studio album by American R&B group Jagged Edge. The album was released on October 27, 2014, by  So So Def Recordings and Hard Case Records. It is a sequel to their multi-platinum album J.E. Heartbreak (2000).

Singles 
The first official single is "Hope" which was released on June 17, 2014, on iTunes. The official music video for "Hope" was released on July 29, 2014.

Commercial performance 
The album debuted at number 28 on the Billboard 200 chart, with first-week sales of 12,572 copies in the United States. In its second, the album dropped to number 75 on the chart, selling 5,493 copies, bringing its total album sales to 18,000 copies.

Track listing

Charts

References

Jagged Edge (American group) albums
2014 albums
Albums produced by Jermaine Dupri
Albums produced by Bryan-Michael Cox
Sequel albums